Constituency NA-162 (Sahiwal-III) was a constituency for the National Assembly of Pakistan. It was abolished after the 2018 delimitations, with the majority of its constituent Chichawatni Tehsil going to NA-149 (Sahiwal-III) along with a lesser share for NA-148 (Sahiwal-II).

Election 2002 

General elections were held on 10 Oct 2002. Rai Aziz Ullah Khan an Independent candidate won by 73,918 votes.

Election 2008 

General elections were held on 18 Feb 2008. Chaudhry Zahid Iqbal of PPP won by 70,634 votes.

Election 2013 

General elections were held on 11 May 2013. Rai Hassan Nawaz of Pakistan tehreek insaf won by 88,974 votes and became the  member of National Assembly.

References

External links 
Election result's official website

NA-162